Kozárovce is an old village and municipality in the Levice District in the Nitra Region of Slovakia.

History
In historical records the village was first mentioned in 1075.

Geography
The village lies at an altitude of 185 metres and covers an area of 21.822 km². It has a population of about 2,022 people.

Demographics
The village is approximately 94% Slovak 5% Romani and almost 1% Hungarian.

Government
The village has its own birth registry.

Facilities
The village has a public library a gym, swimming pool and soccer pitch. It also has a cinema.

Genealogical resources

The records for genealogical research are available at the state archive "Statny Archiv in Banska Bystrica, Slovakia"

 Roman Catholic church records (births/marriages/deaths): 1826-1910 (parish B)

See also
 List of municipalities and towns in Slovakia

References

External links
 www.kozarovce.sk
Surnames of living people in Kozarovce

Villages and municipalities in Levice District